Alex McAleer is a British mentalist who has toured extensively throughout the UK and North America with the ensemble illusion show Champions of Magic.

He has made numerous television appearances including NBC’s Access Hollywood, ITV’s Good Morning Britain, and the worlds longest running children’s television program Blue Peter earning himself a Blue Peter badge.

Career 
McAleer started his professional career in 2007 after receiving a business startup loan form The Prince’s Trust. Before that he had been studying Art & Design at Suffolk College but dropped out to pursue a career in magic.

In 2014 Alex took his one-man show "Alex the Mind Reader" to Edinburgh Festival Fringe as part of the Free Fringe.

In 2016 he received critical acclaim at Perth Fringe World with his show “Mind Reader” where he was nominated for the Cabaret Award. He returned to the festival in 2017 with a revamped version of the same show and a new late night show “Brainwashed”.

In 2014 Alex joined the then emerging illusion show Champions of Magic which tours extensively throughout the UK, USA, and Canada.

References

External links 
 Official Website
 Alex McAleer’s Twitter
 Alex McAleer’s Facebook Page
 Alex McAleer’s Instagram
 Alex McAleer’s YouTube Channel

1986 births
Living people
Mentalists